Shafiqullah Shafaq (or Mohammad Shafiqullah) (born 7 August 1989) is an Afghan cricketer.  He is a right-handed batsman who plays primarily as a wicketkeeper. He played for the Afghanistan national cricket team before being banned from cricket for corruption.

International career
His debut for Afghanistan came against Saudi Arabia in the 2006 Asian Cricket Council Middle East Cup.  His next appearance for the team came in 2008 when Afghanistan played Malaysia as part of the 2008 ACC Trophy Elite, during which he played 5 further matches for Afghanistan during the tournament.  Later, he continued to be a part of the rapidly rising Afghanistan cricket team that in under a year, from 2008–2009, won World Cricket League Division Five, Division Four and Division Three, thus promoting them to Division Two and allowing them to take part in the 2009 ICC World Cup Qualifier where they qualified for One Day International status and first-class status.

It was during the World Cup Qualifier that he made his List-A debut for Afghanistan against Denmark.  He represented Afghanistan in 5 List-A matches during the tournament.

His One Day International debut came in 2009 when Afghanistan played the Netherlands during their 2009 tour of the Netherlands.  His second ODI to date came against Canada in February 2010.

Later in November 2009, he represented Afghanistan in the 2009 ACC Twenty20 Cup, during which he played 5 matches against the national teams China, Singapore, Hong Kong, Saudi Arabia, the United Arab Emirates and Kuwait.  He played in the final of that tournament, which came against the United Arab Emirates and ended up with Afghanistan winning by 8 wickets.

His Twenty20 International debut came against Ireland during the 2010 Quadrangular Twenty20 Series in Sri Lanka in February 2010.  He was later selected as part of the Afghanistan squad for the 2010 ICC World Twenty20 Qualifier, where he played 3 Twenty20 Internationals against Ireland, Scotland and the Netherlands.  Afghanistan won this tournament and therefore qualified for the 2010 ICC World Twenty20.

Shafiqullah was selected to represent Afghanistan at the 2010 Asian Games in which Afghanistan won silver.

Selected as part of Afghanistan's ICC World Twenty20, he did not feature in either of the team's matches against India and South Africa.

Domestic career 
He made his first-class debut for Speen Ghar Region in the 2017–18 Ahmad Shah Abdali 4-day Tournament on 13 November 2017. He also played for Speen Ghar in that year's Regional One Day Tournament and the Speen Ghar Tigers in the 2017 Shpageeza Cricket League.

In 2018, he switched to the Kabul Region team. In April 2018, during a match in the 2018 Ahmad Shah Abdali 4-day Tournament at Asadabad, he scored the fastest double century in first-class cricket. He scored 200 not out from 89 balls, and also scored the most sixes in a first-class match, with 24. To date, this is his only century in professional cricket. He was the leading run-scorer for Kabul Region in the 2018 Ghazi Amanullah Khan Regional One Day Tournament, with 197 runs in four matches. He also played for their first class team in the 2018 Ahmad Shah Abdali 4-day Tournament.

In September 2018, he was named in Nangarhar's squad in the first edition of the Afghanistan Premier League tournament. In October 2019, he played for the Speen Ghar Tigers in the 2019 Sphageeza Cricket League. In November 2019, he was selected to play for the Sylhet Thunder in the 2019–20 Bangladesh Premier League.

Ban for corruption 
In May 2020, Shafiqullah was banned from cricket for six years by the Afghanistan Cricket Board, on charges of corruption relating to the 2018–19 Afghanistan Premier League and the 2019–20 Bangladesh Premier League.

References

External links

Shafiqullah on CricketArchive

1989 births
Living people
Pashtun people
Afghan cricketers
Cricketers from Nangarhar Province
Afghanistan One Day International cricketers
Afghanistan Twenty20 International cricketers
Asian Games medalists in cricket
Cricketers at the 2010 Asian Games
Cricketers at the 2015 Cricket World Cup
Spin Ghar Tigers cricketers
Asian Games silver medalists for Afghanistan
Medalists at the 2010 Asian Games
Kabul Eagles cricketers
Nangarhar Leopards cricketers
Cricketers banned for corruption
Wicket-keepers